Semantometrics is a tool for evaluating research. It is functionally an extension of tools such as bibliometrics, webometrics, and altmetrics, but instead of just evaluating citations – which entails relying on outside evidence – it uses a semantic evaluation of the full text of the research paper being evaluated.

References

External links
Python toolset by Digital Humanities Lab of Utrecht University] 

Library science
Information science
Computational linguistics
Bibliometrics